Rabkavi Banhatti is a town situated on the bank of River Krishna. It was declared a taluka by Karnataka State Govt. on 15 March 2017 and it became operational from 01-Jan-2018. It comes under Jamkhandi subdivision. It has a city municipal council in the Bagalkot district of the Indian state of Karnataka. It forms twin city  along with Rabakavi, Rampur and Hosur. It is a hub of the textile business for the surrounding districts. The people in the town are known for their kind, caring and hardworking nature.

Rabkavi Banhatti is located about 18 km to the west of Jamkhandi subdivision. The town area comprises four places:  Rabkavi, Banhatti, Hosur and Rampur.  In 1952, the municipalities of Rabkavi and Banhatti were merged into one municipality. The place is very famous for its power-loomed and hand-loomed sarees. Rabkavi-Banhatti has more than 22000 power looms which is one of the highest in Karnataka.

The famous temples of the town are Shri Mahadev temple, Danamma Devi Temple (Rabkavi), Shri Shankarling temple, Shri Gurudeva Brahmanandam Ashram and Shri Kadasiddeshwara temple (Banhatti). A fair is conducted every Shravan Maasa in Rabkavi and Bhadrapada Maasa in Banhatti.

Demographics

Males constituted 51% of the population and females 49%. Rabkavi Banhatti has an average literacy rate of 58%, lower than the national average of 59.5%: male literacy was 67%, and female literacy was 49%. In Rabkavi Banhatti, 13% of the population was under 6 years of age.
To reach this place, you can travel by Train+Bus or a Bus.

Travel from Banhatti to Bengaluru takes around 13 hours by train and 17–18 hours by bus.

Economy
Banahatti has a co-operative spinning mill named 'Banahatti Co-operative Spinning Mill Ltd., Banahatti,' established in 1983-84 that operating on its own funds. It runs all year generating jobs to many unemployed people. The main occupation of the people in Banhatti is the manufacturing of sarees and the allied activities like saree folding, dyeing, yarn rolling, etc.

The weaving business has recently experienced a growth larger than ever in history; sarees being produced are sent to bigger markets like Bangalore, Dharwad, Mangalooru, Gulbarga and also to Maharashtra, Tamil Nadu, Andhra Pradesh, Kerala.

Education
There are many schools and colleges in Rabkavi Banhatti. Some of the famous School and colleges are Basaveshwar Kannada Medium School, S.R.A Composite PU College, Banahatti and Sri M V Pattan, College in Rabkavi. which is situated in Banhatti, Konnur and Science PU College in Yallatti. Other popular schools situated nearby are Poorna Prajna English Medium School - Rampur, Jnyanodaya English Medium School - Rampur, Padmavati International School - Rabkavi.

Some of the distinguished personalities who passed out from the schools and colleges of Banhatti are Dr. Sadashivayya Jambayya Nagalotimath (20 July 1940 – 24 October 2006), an Indian medical scientist and writer.[1] He also served as the Director of Karnataka Institute of Medical Sciences, Hubli. He died on 24 October 2006 at the KLE Society's Hospital at the age of 66.

Shri Bhaskar Jeevaji Koparde of Banahatti and his wife Mrs. Subhadrathai Bhaskar Koparde participated in the freedom struggle. Shri Bhaskar J. Koparde was the editor of the Weekly Santavani. Well-known freedom fighter and physician Dr. G D Badchikar represented Karnataka State in All India Medical Conference at New Delhi in the year 1968. He also attended the National conference on "Pollution control and Plantation of trees" held in Secunderabad organized by Government of Andhra Pradesh in 1998. Shankar Bidari has been IG and Police Commissioner - Bangalore. Topper in XLRI- Girish Hukkeri - are also from the same school.

Culture
Sri Kadasidhheshwar Temple is the main temple of the town and considered as "Town God." A fair called 'Banhatti Jatre' is conducted yearly in the month of September or October. A part of enthusiastic celebrations during the fair is the lighting of the fire crackers. The other temples are namely Sri Mallikarjuna Temple, Hanuman Temple, Veerbhadreshwar Temple, Yallamma Temple, Sri Basaveshwar Temple, Kali Temple, Lakshmi Temple and many more.

Banahatti has three theaters namely Vaibhav, Shringar and Mallikarjun theatres.
Government 
Rabkavi-Banahatti is one of 57 Karnataka cities in the Nirmala Nagara - Municipal eGovernance project. On 15 August 2005, each of the cities got a comprehensive website as well as the Public Grievance & Redressal module. Other important modules launched are Property Tax, Financial Accounting, GIS Mapping, Birth & Death Certification, and Ward Works. Nirmala Nagara project is a partnership between the Urban Development Dept, eGovernments Foundation & Survey of India. These computer-based systems coupled with government process re-engineering and GIS digital mapping will provide transparency and accountability and smoother delivery of services to citizens of Karnataka.

Distinguished Personalities 

 Dr. Sadashivayya Jambayya Nagalotimath (20 July 1940 – 24 October 2006), an Indian medical scientist and writer. Also served as the Director of Karnataka Institute of Medical Science, Hubli. 
 Shri Bhaskar Jeevaji Koparde of Banahatti, a freedom fighter and editor of the Weekly, Santavani.
 Mrs. Subhadrathai Bhaskar Koparde, a freedom fighter.
 Shankar Bidari, ex- Police Commissioner of Bangalore and a politician.
 Jayavant Munnoli, a painter and recipient of 2019 Rajyaotsava Award.
 Apoorva Bidari, niece of former DGP Shri Shankar Bidari who cleared KPSC exam with 12th rank in 2019 and is now posted as Assistant Commissioner is also from Banahatti.
 Girish and Satish Hukkeri who are brothers, studied in S R A Higher Secondary School, Banahatti have been successfully contributing to the Information Technology Industry for over 25 years. They have been currently involved in upscaling the traditional industries to achieve Industry 4.0

References

Cities and towns in Bagalkot district